Hoseynabad-e Ashkashan (also Romanized as Ḩoseynābād-e Āshkashān and Ḩoseynābād-e Āshkeshān; also known as Ḩoseynābād) is a village in Baraan-e Shomali Rural District, in the Central District of Isfahan County, Isfahan Province, Iran. At the 2006 census, its population was 440, in 99 families.

References 

Populated places in Isfahan County